The Azumi shrew (Sorex hosonoi) is a species of mammal in the family Soricidae. It is endemic to Japan, where it is found in the mountainous regions of central Honshu Island. It is a close relative of the Eurasian least shrew (Sorex minutissimus). It is threatened by habitat loss.

References

Mammals of Japan
Endemic fauna of Japan
Sorex
Taxonomy articles created by Polbot
Mammals described in 1954